IRIS Tabarzin is a  serving in the Southern Fleet of the Islamic Republic of Iran Navy.

History

Hijack 
Tabarzin was hijacked on her maiden voyage from Cherbourg to Iran, when on 13 August 1981, approximately 15 commandos under guise of tourists aboard the rented tugboat Salazon raided the ship on territorial waters of Spain.
The group Azadegan Organization claimed responsibility for the takeover, stating that they have seized the ship "without a shot" and will use it as a "fighting unit" against the Iranian government.
Following the event, the Iranian foreign ministry started diplomatic efforts to return the ship and released a statement, accusing the United States government of being responsible for the attack:

On 18 August 1981, she harbored at port of Casablanca, Morocco for a refuel and garnering food and water, after they "forced harbor authorities", according to The Christian Science Monitor report. The next day, the hijackers handed over Tabarzin to the French in Toulon, in exchange for permission to stay in France for a group's leader and 25 of his followers.

Refit 
On 1 December 2013, Tabarzin was put into service again after an overhaul that took 30 months. Iranian media reported that in February 2019, she took part in the naval wargame Velayat 97, firing two Qader and Qadir cruise missiles at the targets.

See also 

 List of current ships of the Islamic Republic of Iran Navy
 List of military equipment manufactured in Iran

References 

1978 ships
Ships built in France
Iran–Iraq War naval ships of Iran
Missile boats of the Islamic Republic of Iran Navy
Ships built at Shahid Tamjidi shipyard
Ships of the Islamic Republic of Iran Navy
Ships built in Iran
Missile boats of Iran